Kozo Takeda (born December 27, 1972) is a Japanese actor and former welterweight kickboxer who was competing in K-1 MAX. He won Rajadamnern Stadium champion at welterweight in Muay Thai on January 21, 2001. He has made both the Welterweight and Super Welterweight Rajadamnern Stadium rankings. He is currently a chief adviser of International Sohgoh Budo Federation (ISBF) and he was certified as black belt of the 5th dan in karate by ISBF.

Biography

Student era
Kozo Takeda was born in Adachi, Tokyo, Japan on December 27, 1972. He played rugby when he was in high school, and entered Kokushikan University by recommendation, but dropped out as soon as he watched bouts of Branko Cikatić fight K-1 on television. He started practicing kickboxing at the Jiseikan Gym in Saitama. He joined Seido-Kaikan and increased his weight to 90 kg to enter K-1 as a heavyweight kickboxer, but he rejoined Jiseikan and debuted as a welterweight kickboxer of Shin Nihon Kickboxing Association (SNKA) on March 19, 1995.

He became an actor post his kickboxing career.

SNKA

K-1

Fight record

|-  bgcolor=
| 2010-05-16 || Ex ||align=left| Yoshihiro Satō || SNKA "FINAL Takeda Kozo Retirement Memorial Event" || Bunkyō, Tokyo, Japan || No Decision || 1 || 3:00 ||
|-  bgcolor="#FFBBBB"
| 2009-10-26 || Loss ||align=left| Albert Kraus || K-1 World MAX 2009 World Championship Tournament Final, Super fight || Yokohama, Kanagawa, Japan || TKO (Cut) || 2 || 2:19 || 72-45-20-7
|-  bgcolor=
| 2009-08-30 || Ex ||align=left| Yōsuke Nishijima || SNKA "Brave Hearts 12" || Kōtō, Tokyo, Japan || No Decision || 1 || 2:00 ||
|-  bgcolor="#CCFFCC"
| 2009-05-31 || Win ||align=left| Laitai Muay Thai Plaza || SNKA "Brave Hearts 11" || Bunkyō, Tokyo, Japan || Decision (Unanimous) || 3 || 3:00 || 71-45-19-7
|-  bgcolor="#CCFFCC"
| 2009-01-18 || Win ||align=left| Litidet Wor.Slapol || SNKA "Brave Hearts 10" || Bunkyō, Tokyo, Japan || KO (leg kicks) || 1 || 2:58 || 70-44-19-7
|-  bgcolor="#FFBBBB"
| 2008-12-31 || Loss ||align=left| Tatsuya Kawajiri || Dynamite!! 2008 || Saitama, Saitama, Japan || KO (Left hook) || 1 || 2:47 || 69-43-19-7
|-  bgcolor="#CCFFCC"
| 2008-05-25 || Win ||align=left| Sean Wright || SNKA "Brave Hearts 8" || Bunkyō, Tokyo, Japan || Decision (2-0) || 3 || 3:00 || 68-43-18-7
|-  bgcolor="#FFBBBB"
| 2008-01-20 || Loss ||align=left| John Wayne Parr || SNKA "Brave Hearts 7" || Bunkyō, Tokyo, Japan || KO (Right hook) || 4 || 1:20 || 67-42-18-7
|-
! style=background:white colspan=9 |
|-
|-  bgcolor="#cfc"
| 2007-05-20 || Win ||align=left| Sanmuk Sippapon || SNKA BRAVE HEARTS 5 || Tokyo, Japan || KO (Low Kick) || 2 || 2:15 ||65-41-19-6
|-  bgcolor="#fbb"
| 2007-04-04 || Loss||align=left| Mike Zambidis || K-1 World MAX 2007 World Elite Showcase || Yokohama, Japan || Decision (Unanimous) || 3 || 3:00||64-40-19-6
|-  bgcolor="#cfc"
| 2007-01-21 || Win ||align=left| Che Yon || SNKA BRAVE HEARTS 4 || Tokyo, Japan || KO (Low Kick) || 2 || 0:55 ||63-40-18-6
|-  bgcolor="#FFBBBB"
| 2006-06-30 || Loss ||align=left| Fernando Calleros || K-1 World MAX 2006 World Championship Final || Yokohama, Japan || Decision 3-0 || 3 || 3:00 ||62-39-18-6
|-  bgcolor="#c5d2ea"
| 2006-05-21 || Draw||align=left| Kim Song Sik|| SNKA BRAVE HEARTS 2 || Tokyo, Japan || Decision|| 3 || 3:00 || 61-39-17-6
|-  bgcolor="#fbb"
| 2006-04-28 || Loss||align=left| Jomtap Kransenmaharsarakarm|| SNKA TITANS 3rd || Tokyo, Japan || Decision (Unanimous)|| 3 || 3:00 || 60-39-17-5
|-  bgcolor="#c5d2ea"
| 2005-12-18 || Draw||align=left| Kondet Singpakor|| SNKA FINAL 2005 || Tokyo, Japan || Decision|| 3 || 3:00 || 59-39-16-5
|-  bgcolor="#FFBBBB"
| 2005-10-12 || Loss ||align=left| Andy Souwer || K-1 World MAX 2005 Champions' Challenge || Tokyo, Japan || KO (Punches) || 2 || 0:31 || 58-39-16-4
|-  bgcolor="#FFBBBB"
| 2005-08-22 || Loss ||align=left| John Wayne Parr || SNKA "Titans 2nd" || Shibuya, Tokyo, Japan || KO (Right hook) || 3 || 2:24 || 57-39-15-4
|-
! style=background:white colspan=9 |
|-  bgcolor="#CCFFCC"
| 2005-05-29 || Win ||align=left| Fetpayak Saktawin || SNKA SLEDGE HAMMER || Tokyo, Japan || TKO (Low Kick) || 1 || 0:33 || 56-39-14-4
|-  bgcolor="#CCFFCC"
| 2005-02-23 || Win ||align=left| Kazuyuki Miyata || K-1 World MAX 2005 Japan Tournament || Tokyo, Japan || KO || 3 || 0:39 || 56-38-14-4
|-  bgcolor="#cfc"
| 2005-01-16 || Win||align=left| Techakarin Chuwattana || SNKA ONWARD OPERATION II  || Tokyo, Japan || TKO (Leg Injury) || 3 ||  || 55-37-14-4
|-  bgcolor="#FFBBBB"
| 2004-10-13 || Loss ||align=left| Buakaw Por. Pramuk || K-1 World MAX 2004 Champions' Challenge || Tokyo, Japan || 2 Ext R. Decision (Unanimous) || 5 || 3:00 || 54-36-14-4
|-  bgcolor="#fbb"
| 2004-07-11 || Loss||align=left| Techakarin Chuwattana || SNKA Full Spark's Part 2|| Tokyo, Japan || TKO (Doctor Stoppage)|| 1 || 2:44 || 53-36-13-4
|-  bgcolor="#cfc"
| 2004-07-11 || Win||align=left| Petnakun Sor.Saluaisamchok || SNKA MAGNUM 5 || Tokyo, Japan || Disqualification || 2 ||  || 52-36-12-4
|-  bgcolor="#cfc"
| 2004-05-30 || Win||align=left| Chuchai Bor.Chor.Ror.Sorn || SNKA Super-Hybrid  || Tokyo, Japan || KO (Right Cross) || 2 || 0:07 || 51-35-12-4
|-  bgcolor="#FFBBBB"
| 2004-02-24 || Loss ||align=left| Takayuki Kohiruimaki || K-1 World MAX 2004 Japan Tournament Semi Finals || Tokyo, Japan || KO (Flying Knee) || 2 || 1:05 || 50-34-12-4
|-  bgcolor="#CCFFCC"
| 2004-02-24 || Win ||align=left| Kenichi Ogata || K-1 World MAX 2004 Japan Tournament || Shibuya, Tokyo, Japan || TKO (Towel thrown) || 1 || 3:00 || 49-34-11-4
|-  bgcolor="#cfc"
| 2004-01-25 || Win||align=left| Jose Garcia || SNKA Onward Operation || Tokyo, Japan || KO (Right Low Kick) || 1 || 0:25 ||48-33-11-4
|-  bgcolor="#FFBBBB"
| 2003-09-07 || Loss ||align=left| Paul Lee || SNKA Full Sparrk's || Tokyo, Japan || Decision (Majority) || 5 || 3:00 ||47-32-11-4
|-  bgcolor="#FFBBBB"
| 2003-07-05 || Loss ||align=left| Duane Ludwig || K-1 World MAX 2003 World Tournament Final, Quarter Finals || Saitama, Japan || KO (Left Hook) || 2 || 0:46 || 46-32-10-4
|-  bgcolor="#FFBBBB"
| 2003-03-01 || Loss ||align=left| Masato || K-1 World MAX 2003 Japan Grand Prix, Final || Kōtō, Tokyo, Japan || Decision (Unanimous) || 3 || 3:00 || 45-32-9-4
|-
! style=background:white colspan=9 |
|-
|-  bgcolor="#CCFFCC"
| 2003-03-01 || Win ||align=left| Yasuhiro Kazuya || K-1 World MAX 2003 Japan Grand Prix, Semi-final || Kōtō, Tokyo, Japan || Decision (Unanimous) || 3 || 3:00|| 44-32-8-4
|-  bgcolor="#CCFFCC"
| 2003-03-01 || Win ||align=left| Kojirō || K-1 World MAX 2003 Japan Grand Prix, Quarter-Final || Kōtō, Tokyo, Japan || Decision (Unanimous) || 3 || 3:00 || 43-31-8-4
|-  bgcolor="#c5d2ea"
| 2003-01-26 || Draw ||align=left| Chaowalit Jockygym || SNKA DOWN BY LOW|| Tokyo, Japan || Decision  || 5 || 3:00 || 42-30-8-4
|-  bgcolor="#c5d2ea"
| 2002-12-01 || Draw ||align=left| Petpayak Sor.Sungtong || || Thailand || Decision  || 5 || 3:00 || 41-30-8-3
|-  bgcolor="#cfc"
| 2002-09-22 || Win||align=left| Mekkenar Sor.Kingstar || SNKA Advance Attack!|| Tokyo, Japan || KO (Low kick)  || 1 || 1:12 || 40-30-8-2
|-  bgcolor="#fbb"
| 2002-07-27 || Loss||align=left| Burnan Sakhomsing || SNKA BREAK A WAY!|| Tokyo, Japan || TKO (Doctor Stoppage)  || 3 || 1:11 || 39-29-8-2
|-  bgcolor="#fbb"
| 2002-05-26 || Loss||align=left| Sagetdao Kiatputon || SNKA LOCK ON!|| Tokyo, Japan || KO (Left Cross) || 1 || 0:58 || 38-29-7-2
|-  bgcolor="#cfc"
| 2002-03-24 || Win||align=left| Big Ben Nopparatfarm || SNKA GET FORWARD!|| Tokyo, Japan || KO (Low Kick) || 3 || 1:04 || 37-29-6-2
|-  bgcolor="#cfc"
| 2002-01-27 || Win||align=left| Saibetnoi Kiatsidar || SNKA STRIKE BACK!|| Tokyo, Japan || KO (Low Kick) || 3 || 0:19 || 36-28-6-2
|-  bgcolor="#cfc"
| 2001-11-26 || Win||align=left| Joknoi Davy || Rajadamnern Stadium|| Bangkok, Thailand || TKO (Low Kick) || 2 || || 35-27-6-2
|-  bgcolor="#FFBBBB"
| 2001-09-16 || Loss ||align=left| Charnvit Kiat Tor.Bor.Ubon|| SNKA "Take One"|| Tokyo, Japan || TKO (Doctor stoppage/Cut) || 3 || 3:00|| 34-26-6-2
|-
! style=background:white colspan=9 |
|-  bgcolor="#cfc"
| 2001-05-27 || Win||align=left| Sitthichok Sor Upon || SNKA The Star Fleet || Bunkyō, Tokyo, Japan || KO (Low Kicks) || 2 || 2:26 || 33-26-5-2
|-  bgcolor="#cfc"
| 2001-03-31 || Win||align=left| Kaoklai Kaennorsing || SNKA "Real Champion Appearance" || Bunkyō, Tokyo, Japan || Decision (Unanimous) || 5 || 3:00 || 32-25-5-2
|-
|-  bgcolor="#CCFFCC"
| 2001-01-21 || Win ||align=left| Chalarmdam Sittrattrakarn || SNKA || Tokyo, Japan || KO (Right hook)  || 2 || || 31-24-5-2
|-
! style=background:white colspan=9 |
|-  bgcolor="#fbb"
| 2000-12-03 || Loss ||align=left| Chaowalit Jockygym || SNKA Fight to Muay-Thai 2000 || Tokyo, Japan || Decision (Unanimous) || 5 || 3:00 || 30-23-5-2
|-  bgcolor="#cfc"
| 2000-10-28 || Win||align=left| Eugene Elkkeboom|| SNKA ROAD TO MUAY-THAI 2000 || Tokyo, Japan || KO (Right Hook) || 1 || 1:16 || 29-23-4-2
|-
|-  bgcolor="#cfc"
| 2000-07-29 || Win||align=left| Jacksin Chuwattana || SNKA NO KICK, NO LIFE || Tokyo, Japan || KO (Punches) || 5 || 1:43 || 28-22-4-2
|-  bgcolor="#c5d2ea"
| 2000-05-05 || Draw ||align=left| Chalarmdam Sittrattrakarn || SNKA || Tokyo, Japan || Decision || 5 || 3:00 || 27-21-4-2
|-
! style=background:white colspan=9 |
|-
|-  bgcolor="#CCFFCC"
| 2000-03-26 || Win ||align=left| Kongfak Lookmekrong || SNKA "Speed King" || Kōtō, Tokyo, Japan || KO (Punches) || 2 || 1:29 || 26-21-4-1
|-  bgcolor="#CCFFCC"
| 2000-01-23 || Win ||align=left| Masaru Kitazawa || SNKA "Double Impact" || Kōtō, Tokyo,　Japan || Decision (Unanimous) || 3 || 3:00 || 25-20-4-1
|-
! style=background:white colspan=9 |
|-
|-  bgcolor="#CCFFCC"
| 1999-11-28 || Win ||align=left| Yongsak Kungwanbrai || Rajadamnern Stadium || Bangkok, Thailand || KO || 2 ||  || 24-19-4-1
|-  bgcolor="#CCFFCC"
| 1999-10-30 || Win ||align=left| James Fler || SNKA "Road to Muay-Thai 2nd" || Kōtō, Tokyo, Japan || KO (3 Knockdowns/Low Kicks) || 1 || 2:56 || 23-18-4-1
|-  bgcolor="#CCFFCC"
| 1999-07-24 || Win ||align=left| Chunchai Kaewsamrit || SNKA "Ha-Oh-Den" || Kōtō, Tokyo, Japan || TKO || 2 || 1:53 || 22-17-4-1
|-  bgcolor="#CCFFCC"
| 1999-05-05 || Win ||align=left| Wanchai Ted-udom || SNKA "Japan-Thailand Battle PartIII -The big four Arrives-" || Kōtō, Tokyo, Japan || KO || 2 || 1:49 || 21-16-4-1
|-  bgcolor="#CCFFCC"
| 1999-03-13 || Win ||align=left| Darnsai Suito-or || SNKA || Kōtō, Tokyo, Japan || KO || 1 || 1:38 || 20-15-4-1
|-  bgcolor="#FFBBBB"
| 1999-01-30 || Loss ||align=left| Artsnalong Borkhorsor || SNKA || Kōtō, Tokyo, Japan || Decision (Unanimous) || 3 || 3:00 || 19-14-4-1
|-  bgcolor="#FFBBBB"
| 1998-10-31 || Loss ||align=left| Payaklek Yutakit || SNKA || Kōtō, Tokyo, Japan || Decision (2-0) || 3 || 3:00 || 18-14-3-1
|-  bgcolor="#CCFFCC"
| 1998-09-20 || Win ||align=left| Shigeo Takasugi || SNKA || Koshigaya, Saitama, Japan || TKO (Corner Stop/Low Kicks) || 4 || 2:25 || 17-14-2-1
|-  bgcolor="#CCFFCC"
| 1998-07-25 || Win ||align=left| Yoshihiro Teraoka || SNKA || Kōtō, Tokyo, Japan || KO (Right hook) || 2 || 2:23 || 16-13-2-1
|-  bgcolor="#CCFFCC"
| 1998-06-14 || Win ||align=left| Chentainoi Sor.Gedalinchai || SNKA || Akishima, Tokyo, Japan || Decision (2-0) || 3 || 3:00 || 15-12-2-1
|-  bgcolor="#CCFFCC"
| 1998-05-05 || Win ||align=left| Jay Duncan || SNKA || Kōtō, Tokyo, Japan || KO (Low Kick)|| 2 ||  || 14-11-2-1
|-  bgcolor="#CCFFCC"
| 1998-04-19 || Win ||align=left| Song-O Yuh || SNKA || Koshigaya, Saitama, Japan || KO (Left hook) || 1 || 1:35 || 13-10-2-1
|-  bgcolor="#CCFFCC"
| 1998-01-31 || Win ||align=left| Fernando Calleros || SNKA || Kōtō, Tokyo, Japan || KO || 3 ||  || 12-9-2-1
|-  bgcolor="#FFBBBB"
| 1997-10-18 || Loss ||align=left| Plawei Chuwattana || SNKA || Kōtō, Tokyo, Japan || KO || 3 || 0:13 || 11-9-1-1
|-  bgcolor="#CCFFCC"
| 1997-08-02 || Win ||align=left| Jung-I Park || SNKA || Koshigaya, Saitama, Japan || KO || 2 || 2:00 || 10-9-0-1
|-  bgcolor="#CCFFCC"
| 1997-06-27 || Win ||align=left| Jalwat Oenjai || SNKA || Ichihara, Chiba, Japan || KO || 1 || 1:50 || 9-8-0-1
|-  bgcolor="#CCFFCC"
| 1997-03-09 || Win ||align=left| Joe Sexton|| SNKA || Kōtō, Tokyo, Japan || KO || 2 || 1:17 || 8-7-0-1
|-  bgcolor="#CCFFCC"
| 1997-01-11 || Win ||align=left| Keizō Matsuba || SNKA || Kōtō, Tokyo, Japan || TKO || 3 || 0:26 || 7-6-0-1
|-
! style=background:white colspan=9 |
|-
|-  bgcolor="#CCFFCC"
| 1996-12-01 || Win ||align=left| Hiromi Terada || SNKA || Aichi, Japan || KO || 2 || 3:00 || 6-5-0-1
|-
|-  bgcolor="#CCFFCC"
| 1996-09-21 || Win ||align=left| Katsumori Maita || SNKA || Koshigaya, Saitama, Japan || Decision (2-0) || 3 || 3:00 || 5-4-0-1
|-
|-  bgcolor="#CCFFCC"
| 1996-05-25 || Win ||align=left| Yūto Ōhira || SNKA || Tsu, Mie, Japan || KO || 3 ||  || 4-3-0-1
|-
|-  bgcolor="#CCFFCC"
| 1996-04-29 || Win ||align=left| Susumu Iwama || SNKA || Kōtō, Tokyo, Japan || Decision (Unanimous) || 3 || 3:00 || 3-2-0-1
|-
|-  bgcolor="#c5d2ea"
| 1995-03-31 || Draw ||align=left| Toshiyuki Kinami || SNKA || Kōtō, Tokyo, Japan || Decision (0-0) || 3 || 3:00 || 2-1-0-1
|-
|-  bgcolor="#CCFFCC"
| 1995-03-19 || Win ||align=left| Tadao Sugiyama || SNKA || Japan || KO || 3 || 3:00 || 1-1-0-0
|-
|-
| colspan=9 | Legend:

Titles
2003 K-1 World MAX Japan tournament runner-up
2001 Rajadamnern Stadium Welterweight champion
Shin Nihon Kickboxing Association Welterweight champion

Filmography
Sanada Maru (2016), Ōno Harufusa
Awaiting Kirin (2021), Hongan-ji Kennyo
The Legend and Butterfly (2023), Mori Yoshinari

See also
List of male kickboxers
List of K-1 events

References

External links
Official K-1 website
Takeda Kozo Official blog (In Japanese)

1972 births
Living people
Japanese male kickboxers
Welterweight kickboxers
Japanese male karateka
People from Adachi, Tokyo